This is a list of the 18 members of the European Parliament for Sweden in the 2009 to 2014 session. One person from Pirate Party and one from Social Democratic Party entered the Parliament in December 2011, bringing the number of MEPs to 20.

List

Notes

External links
 
 List of preferences votes (in Swedish)

Sweden
List
2009